is a Japanese voice actress, affiliated with Raccoon Dog. She is known for her roles in 86 as Vladilena Milizé, Tsukihime -A piece of blue glass moon- as Arcueid Brunestud and Bocchi the Rock! as Ikuyo Kita.

Biography

Filmography

Anime

2016
Aikatsu Stars!, Motoko

2018
Seven Senses of the Reunion, Momoi
Chio's School Road, Fuyumi Nojo (episode 12)
Happy Sugar Life, Mitori Tajima
Iroduku: The World in Colors, Sanami Asagawa
Dakaichi, Maki Shimura

2019
Domestic Girlfriend, Kanae
My Roommate Is a Cat, Daisho
Cautious Hero: The Hero Is Overpowered but Overly Cautious, Giorne (episode 9)

2020
If My Favorite Pop Idol Made It to the Budokan, I Would Die, Sorane Matsuyama
Interspecies Reviewers, Erusha
Seton Academy: Join the Pack!, Hana Hoshino
Umayon!, Mihono Bourbon

2021
Uma Musume Pretty Derby Season 2, Mihono Bourbon
Bottom-tier Character Tomozaki, Minami Nanami 
86, Vladilena Milizé
How a Realist Hero Rebuilt the Kingdom, Aisha Udgard
Blue Period, Shirai
The Way of the Househusband, Fuwafuwa Kitchen Waitress

2022
Delicious Party Pretty Cure, Wakana Tamaki, Recipeppi,  Moe Yamakura
Miss Shachiku and the Little Baby Ghost, Shino
Love After World Domination, Desumi Magahara
In the Heart of Kunoichi Tsubaki, Shion
My Stepmom's Daughter Is My Ex, Akatsuki Minami
My Master Has No Tail, Koito
Bocchi the Rock!, Ikuyo Kita

2023
Buddy Daddies, Karin Izumi
Ippon Again!, Kotoko Nogisaka
Dead Mount Death Play, Furuto Ichinose
Cute Executive Officer R, Yoshine Fudō
World Dai Star, Shizuka

Films 
2018
Flavors of Youth, Xiao Yu

Video games 
2017
Genjū Keiyaku Cryptract, Sherida
Tenka Hyakken -Zan-, Kuniyuki Akashi

2020
Azur Lane, Casablanca
Brown Dust, Rosengart

2021
Blue Archive, Asuna Ichinose
Tsukihime -A piece of blue glass moon-, Arcueid Brunestud
Melty Blood: Type Lumina, Arcueid Brunestud, Red Arcueid and Neco-Arc 
Lost Judgment, Yurie Nozaki
2022
 Fate/Grand Order, Arcueid Brunestud (Archetype: Earth)
 Lackgirl I as Subaru

References

External links
Official agency profile 

Living people
Japanese video game actresses
Japanese voice actresses
Voice actresses from Tochigi Prefecture
Year of birth missing (living people)
21st-century Japanese actresses